Robert Malley (born 1963) is an American lawyer, political scientist and specialist in conflict resolution, who was the lead negotiator on the 2015 Iran nuclear deal known as the Joint Comprehensive Plan of Action (JCPOA). He is currently the U.S. Special Envoy to Iran, tasked with bringing the United States and Iran into compliance with the Iran nuclear deal abandoned by President Donald Trump.

Malley was Director for Democracy, Human Rights and Humanitarian Affairs at the National Security Council from 1994 to 1996 and Program Director for Middle East and North Africa at the International Crisis Group and Assistant to National Security Advisor Sandy Berger from 1996 to 1998. He served in the National Security Council under President Barack Obama from 2014 to 2017. In 2015, the Obama administration appointed Malley as its "point man" on the Middle East, leading the Middle East desk of the National Security Council. In November 2015, Malley was named as President Obama's new special ISIS advisor. After leaving the Obama administration, Malley was President and CEO of the International Crisis Group, a Brussels non-profit committed to preventing wars.

Malley is considered, by some, to be an expert on the Israeli–Palestinian conflict and has written extensively on this subject advocating rapprochement with Hamas and Muslim Brotherhood. As Special Assistant to President Clinton, he was a member of the U.S. peace team and helped organize the 2000 Camp David Summit.

In January 2021, President Joe Biden named Malley as special U.S. envoy for Iran.

Early life
Malley was born in 1963 to Barbara (née Silverstein) Malley, a New Yorker who worked for the United Nations delegation of the Algerian National Liberation Front (FLN), and her husband, Simon Malley (1923–2006), an Egyptian-born Jewish journalist who grew up in Egypt and worked as a foreign correspondent for Al Gomhuria. The elder Malley spent time in New York, writing about international affairs, particularly about nationalist, anti-imperial movements in Africa, and made a key contribution by putting the FLN on the world map.

In 1969, the elder Malley moved his family—including son Robert—to France, where he founded the leftist magazine Africasia (later known as Afrique Asia).  Robert attended École Jeannine Manuel, a prestigious bilingual school in Paris, and graduated in the same class (1980) as U.S. Secretary of State Antony Blinken.

The Malleys remained in France until 1980, when then French president Valéry Giscard d'Estaing briefly expelled Simon Malley from the country to New York, due to his hostility towards the West  and Israel.

Malley attended Yale University, and was a 1984 Rhodes Scholar at Magdalen College, Oxford, where he earned a D.Phil. in political philosophy. There he wrote his doctoral thesis about Third-worldism and its decline. Malley continued writing about foreign policy, including extended commentary about the Israeli-Palestinian conflict. He earned a J.D. at Harvard Law School, where he met his future wife, Caroline Brown. Another fellow law school student was Barack Obama. In 1991–1992, Malley clerked for Supreme Court Justice Byron White, while Brown clerked for Supreme Court Justice Sandra Day O'Connor. As of 2010, the couple has two sons, Miles and Baby Boy Brown, and one daughter, Frances.

Career
After his Supreme Court clerkship, Malley became a Fellow at the Council on Foreign Relations where he published The Call From Algeria: Third Worldism, Revolution, and the Turn to Islam—a book that charts Algeria's political evolution from the turn of the 20th century to the present, exploring the historical and intellectual underpinnings of the crisis in Algeria. His book received critical acclaim, and Malley was described as "exceptionally well read, creative in seeing connections and influences, and gifted with a graceful, if world-weary writing style."

Clinton administration
Malley served in the Clinton administration as Director for Democracy, Human Rights and Humanitarian Affairs at the National Security Council from 1994 to 1996. In that post he helped coordinate refugee policy, efforts to promote democracy and human rights abroad and U.S. policy toward Cuba. From 1996–1998 he was Executive Assistant to National Security Advisor Sandy Berger. In October 1998, Malley was appointed Special Assistant to President Clinton for Arab-Israeli Affairs, a post he held until the end of the administration in 2001.

International Crisis Group
After his service with the administration, Malley became Senior Policy Advisor for the Center for Middle East Peace and Economic Development in Washington, D.C. He later became Program Director for Middle East and North Africa at the International Crisis Group in Washington, D.C., directing analysts based in Amman, Cairo, Beirut, Tel Aviv and Baghdad. Malley's team covers events from Iran to Morocco, with a heavy focus on the Arab–Israeli conflict, the situation in Iraq, and Islamist movements throughout the region. Malley also covers developments in the United States that affect policy toward the Middle East.

Obama campaign and administration
According to Barack Obama's 2008 presidential campaign, Malley provided informal advice to the campaign in the past without having any formal role in the campaign. On May 9, 2008, the campaign severed ties with Malley when the British Times reported that Malley had been in discussions with the militant Palestinian group Hamas, listed by the U.S. State Department as a terrorist organization. In response, Malley told The Times he had been in regular contact with Hamas officials as part of his work with the International Crisis Group. "My job with the International Crisis Group is to meet with all sorts of savory and unsavory people and report on what they say. I've never denied whom I meet with; that's what I do", Malley told NBC News, adding that he informs the State Department about his meetings beforehand and briefs them afterward.

The New York Times reported on 18 February 2014 that Malley was joining the Obama administration to consult on Persian Gulf policy as senior director of the National Security Council. On 6 March, the National Security Council announced that Malley would be replacing Philip Gordon as the Special Assistant to the President and White House Coordinator for the Middle East, North Africa and the Gulf Region, effective on 6 April 2015.

Lead Iran deal negotiator

Malley was the lead U.S. negotiator on the Joint Comprehensive Plan of Action, signed on July 14, 2015provide URL of signed/dated page, which limited Iran's nuclear activities and ensured international inspections of its nuclear facilities in exchange for lifting economic sanctions. In describing the negotiating challenges, Malley later wrote in The Atlantic, "The real choice in 2015 was between achieving a deal that constrained the size of Iran’s nuclear program for many years and ensured intrusive inspections forever, or not getting one, meaning no restrictions at all coupled with much less verification.

On November 30, 2015, it was reported that Malley would become the National Security Council's "ISIS Czar

Return to International Crisis Group
After Obama left office, Malley returned to the International Crisis Group, serving as the new Vice President for Policy. He is currently the President and CEO.

U.S. Special Envoy to Iran
On January 28, 2021, President Biden named Malley U.S. special envoy to Iran, where he was tasked with trying to ease diplomatic tensions with Iran and rein in its nuclear program by compliance to the original pact.

Views
Malley has published several articles on the failed 2000 Camp David Summit in which he participated as a member of the U.S. negotiating team. Malley rejects the mainstream opinion that lays all the blame for the failure of the summit on Arafat and the Palestinian delegation. In his analysis, the main reasons were the tactics of then-Israeli prime minister Ehud Barak and the substance of his proposal which made it impossible for Arafat to accept Barak's offer.

Malley argues that negotiations with the Palestinians today must include Hamas because the Palestine Liberation Organization (PLO) is no longer considered the Palestinian people's sole legitimate representative. He describes the PLO as antiquated, worn out, barely functioning, and, because it does not include the broad Islamist current principally represented by Hamas, of questionable authority. Malley favors negotiating with Hamas at least for the purpose of a ceasefire—citing Hamas officials in Gaza who made clear they were prepared for such an agreement with Israel.

He supported (in 2008) efforts to reach an Israel-Hamas ceasefire which would include an immediate end to Palestinian rocket launches and sniper fire and a freeze on Israeli military attacks on Gaza. Malley's arguments rest on both humanitarian and practical reasons. Malley points to the blockade imposed by Israel on the Gaza Strip has not stopped Hamas's rocket attacks on nearby Israeli towns and notes that the siege has caused millions of Gazans to suffer from lack of medicine, fuel, electricity and other essential commodities, so cease-fire would avoid "enormous loss of life, a generation of radicalized and embittered Gazans, and another bankrupt peace process."

Malley has published many articles in which he calls upon the Israelis (and the international community) to bring Hamas to the negotiating table in order to secure an Israeli–Palestinian ceasefire and insure that any agreement reached with Palestinians will be respected by the Islamist movements in Palestinian society too.

In addition, Malley calls for Israel, the Palestinians, Lebanon, Syria and other Arab countries to resume negotiations on all tracks based on the Arab Peace Initiative, which promises full Arab recognition and normalization of relations with Israel in the context of a comprehensive peace agreement in exchange for a withdrawal of Israeli forces from the occupied territories to the 1967 armistice (Green) Line, the recognition of an independent Palestinian state with East Jerusalem as its capital, and a "just solution" for Palestinian refugees.

"Today, Malley still stands out for his calls to engage in negotiations with Syria and Iran and for finding 'some kind of accommodation' with Hamas", The Jewish Daily Forward reported in February 2008.

Criticism
Malley was criticized after co-authoring an article in the July 8, 2001, edition of The New York Review of Books arguing that the blame for the failure of the 2000 Camp David Summit should be divided among all three leaders who were present at the summit, Arafat, Barak, and Bill Clinton, not just Arafat, as was suggested by some mainstream policy analysts.  "Later, however, other scholars and former officials voiced similar views to those of Malley", according to a February 20, 2008, article in The Jewish Daily Forward.

Malley and his views have come under attack from other critics, such as Martin Peretz of the magazine The New Republic, who has opined that Malley is "anti-Israel", a "rabid hater of Israel. No question about it", and that several of his articles in the New York Review of Books were "deceitful." On the conservative webzine The American Thinker, Ed Lasky asserted that Malley "represents the next generation of anti-Israel activism."

Malley told the Jewish Daily Forward that "it tends to cross the line when it becomes as personal and as un-based in facts as some of these have been." While he loved and respected his father, he said, their views sometimes differed, and it is "an odd guilt by association" fallacy to criticize him based on his father's views. Simon Malley was called a sympathizer of the PLO by Daniel Pipes.

In response to what they called "vicious, personal attacks" on Malley, five Jewish, former U.S. government officials—former National Security Advisor Sandy Berger, Ambassador Martin Indyk, Ambassador Daniel C. Kurtzer, Ambassador Dennis Ross, and former State Department Senior Advisor Aaron David Miller—published a letter (dated February 12, 2008) in the New York Review of Books defending Malley. They wrote that the attacks on Malley were "unfair, inappropriate, and wrong", and objected to what they called an attempt "to undermine the credibility of a talented public servant who has worked tirelessly over the years to promote Arab–Israeli peace and US national interests." This view is also shared by M.J. Rosenberg, a former editor at the American Israel Public Affairs Committee and a controversial critic of Israeli policies, who condemned the attacks on Malley, writing that Malley is "pro-Israel" and the only reason he is being criticized is because he supports Israeli–Palestinian negotiations.

In October 2022, following a massive demonstration by Iranians in Berlin  and elsewhere including Washington, D.C. in support of protests in Iran, Malley tweeted that "Marchers in Washington and cities around the world are showing their support for the Iranian people, who continue to peacefully demonstrate for their government to respect their dignity and human rights." He came under fire by Iranians and non-Iranians for undermining the protests in Iran to a mere demand for respect and some asked him to step down from his position. In response, he accepted that his words "were poorly worded.". In his interview with Iran International, he stressed that "“It is not up to me; it is not up to the US government what the brave women and men who have been demonstrating in Iran want. It is up to them.”. Despite Malley's apology, Masih Alinejad, Iranian-American journalist and human right activist started a petition to remove him from his post as Special US Envoy for Iran. The petition demands that President Biden "appoint a new Special Envoy that the people in the U.S. and in Iran can trust and respect as a symbol of America’s commitment to freedom and democracy."

Published books
 The Call from Algeria: Third Worldism, Revolution, and the Turn to Islam, Berkeley: University of California Press (1996),

Selected published articles
 Robert Malley, The Gaza time bomb, The International Herald Tribune, January 21, 2008
 Robert Malley & Hussein Agha, "Middle East Triangle", The Washington Post, January 17, 2008
 Robert Malley & Hussein Agha, "The Road from Mecca", New York Review of Books, May 10, 2007
 Robert Malley, "Forget Pelosi. What About Syria?", The Los Angeles Times, April 11, 2007
 Robert Malley & Henry Siegman, "The Hamas Factor", The International Herald-Tribune, December 27, 2006
 Robert Malley & Peter Harling, "Containing a Shiite symbol of hope", The Christian Science Monitor, October 24, 2006
 Robert Malley, "Mideast: Avoiding failure with Hamas", The International Herald-Tribune, April 10, 2006
 Robert Malley & Gareth Evans, "How to Curb the Tension in Gaza", The Financial Times, July 5, 2006
 Robert Malley & Peter Harling, "The enemy we hardly know", The Boston Globe, March 19, 2006
 Robert Malley, "Making the Best of Hamas' Victory", Common Ground News Service, March 2, 2006
 Robert Malley & Hussein Agha, "Hamas has arrived - but there are limits to its advance", The Guardian, January 24, 2006
 Robert Malley & Hussein Agha, "A durable Middle East peace: Oslo didn't achieve it, nor has the Bush "road map." So what would satisfy both sides?",American Prospect, November 1, 2003
 Robert Malley & Hussein Agha, "Camp David and After: An Exchange (A Reply to Ehud Barak)", New York Review of Books, June 13, 2002
 Robert Malley, "Rebuilding a Damaged Palestine", The New York Times, May 7, 2002
 Robert Malley, "Playing into Sharon's Hands", The New York Times, January 25, 2002
 Robert Malley & Hussein Agha, "Camp David: The Tragedy of Errors", New York Review of Books, August 9, 2001

See also 
 List of law clerks of the Supreme Court of the United States (Seat 6)

References

External links
 Robert Malley at the International Crisis Group
 
 
 
 
 Malley's Testimony to the Senate Committee on Foreign Relations SubCommittee on Near East Affairs, November 8, 2007

1963 births
Living people
American diplomats
20th-century American Jews
American lawyers
American political scientists
American Rhodes Scholars
Middle Eastern studies scholars
Yale University alumni
Alumni of Magdalen College, Oxford
Harvard Law School alumni
Law clerks of the Supreme Court of the United States
Clinton administration personnel
Obama administration personnel
Biden administration personnel
United States National Security Council staffers
Israeli–Palestinian peace process
Date of birth missing (living people)
Place of birth missing (living people)
21st-century American Jews